Arlyan (Ärlän) is a rural locality (a village) in Sandugachevsky Selsoviet, Yanaulsky District, Bashkortostan, Russia. The population was 93 as of 2010. There are 2 streets.

Geography 
Arlyan is located 13 km east of Yanaul (the district's administrative centre) by road. Sandugach is the nearest rural locality.

References 

Rural localities in Yanaulsky District